Georgy Butmi de Katzman (1856–1919) — Russian journalist, writer and economist (author of books and papers on economy), member of the Union of the Russian People.

Butmi opposed introduction of gold standard and supported bimetallism in his writings.

Butmi edited and/or published the Russian language editions of the Protocols of the wise men of Zion, in 1906, and 1907, respectively, after the Pavel Krushevan 1903 and Sergei Nilus 1905 editions. The first edition was published by Pavel A. Krushevan in Znamya in 1903; it has come to be known as the "shorter version." The second version was published by Sergei Nilus as chapter twelve in the 1905 second edition of his book, Velikoe v malom... (The Great within the Minuscule...), on the coming of the anti-Christ. Butmi's, therefore, is essentially the third major edition in any language.

References 
Norman Cohn. Warrant for Genocide (London: Serif, 1967, 1996) .

External links
 WorldCat:
 Library of Congress:

1856 births
1919 deaths
Members of the Union of the Russian People
Members of the Russian Assembly
Russian writers
Russian journalists
Protocols of the Elders of Zion
Russian anti-communists